Femme Fatale(s) may refer to:

 Femme fatale, an archetypal character of literature and art

Film and television 
 Femme Fatale (1991 film), an American drama starring Colin Firth
 Femme Fatale (2002 film), a film directed by Brian De Palma
 Femme Fatale, Jang Hee-bin, a 1968 South Korean film
 Femme Fatale: Bae Jeong-ja, a 1973 South Korean film
 Femme Fatales (TV series), a 2011–2012 American anthology series
 Supermodel Me: Femme Fatale, season 4 of the Asian reality series Supermodel Me

Literature
 Femme Fatales (comics), a group of Marvel Comics supervillains
 Femme Fatales (magazine), a 1992–2008 American men's magazine
 Femme Fatales, a 2009 Iron Man novel by Robert Greenberger

Music 
 Femme Fatale (band), an American hard rock band

Albums 
 Femme Fatale (Akina Nakamori album), 1988
 Femme Fatale (Britney Spears album), 2011
 Femme Fatale Tour, a 2011 concert tour
 Femme Fatale (Femme Fatale album), 1988
 Femme Fatale (Gábor Szabó album) or the title song, 1981
 Femme Fatale (Miki Howard album), 1992
 Femme Fatale: The Aura Anthology, by Nico, 2003

Songs 
 "Femme Fatale" (The Velvet Underground song), 1966
 "Femme Fatale", by Evdokia Kadi representing Cyprus at Eurovision 1988

Other uses 
 Femme fatale fireflies or Photuris, a genus of lampyrid beetle
 Femmes Fatales, an independent women's professional wrestling promotion